Carlos Figueroa (12 December 1931 – 18 January 2012) was a Spanish equestrian. He competed at the 1956 Summer Olympics. His grandfather, Don Álvaro de Figueroa, was the Prime Minister of Spain between 1912 and 1918.

References

1931 births
2012 deaths
Spanish male equestrians
Olympic equestrians of Spain
Equestrians at the 1956 Summer Olympics